Chér is the third studio album by American singer-actress Cher, released on September 5, 1966 by Imperial. Cher collaborates again with Sonny Bono, with Harold Battiste and with Stan Ross. The album is by-and-large a covers album and contains only one song written by Bono. This album was a moderate commercial success, peaking at number 59 on the Billboard 200.

Album information
Chér was released in 1966, produced by Sonny Bono and issued by the Liberty Records subsidiary, Imperial Records.

The album again follows the same formula of the two previous albums, with rearranged covers and new songs written by Bono exclusively for her. There's more French influence in the record and more folk. The only hit in Europe generated from this album was her version of Burt Bacharach's "Alfie" from the Michael Caine movie. Although her version was on the film's soundtrack, it didn't fare nearly as well as the Dionne Warwick version—now considered definitive.

Despite the lack of impact it had on the market there were three singles released: the ballad "Alfie", "I Feel Something in the Air" and "Sunny". In this year Cher recorded also three other songs: "She's No Better Than Me" released on the b-side of the "Alfie" single, "Ma Piano (Per Non Svegliarmi)" and "Nel Mio Cielo Ci Sei Tu", an Italian version of "I Feel Something in the Air" released on the b-side of "Ma Piano (Per Non Svegliarmi)". Though not as successful as the two records preceding it,  Chér did manage to score a European top ten hit with "Sunny". "Alfie" and "I Feel Like Something's In The Air" also charted, but only peaked at #26 in Canada, #32 in the United States; and 43 in the United Kingdom respectively.

In December 2005, this album and Cher's next album With Love, Chér were reissued on one CD called Chér/With Love which featured all the tracks from both.

Track listing

Personnel
Cher - lead vocals
Sonny Bono - producer
Carol Kaye, Don Peake, Dr. John - guitar
David Cohen, Mike Post - 12-string guitar
Lyle Ritz - electric bass guitar
Cliff Hills - upright bass
Gabriel Mekler - piano
Michel Rubini - harpsichord
Frank Capp - drums
Gene Estes, Jim Gordon, Jungle Geno - percussion
George Poole - violin, flute
Harold Battiste - musical arranger, musical conductor
Technical
Stan Ross - sound engineer
Woody Woodward - art direction

Charts

References

1966 albums
Cher albums
Liberty Records albums
EMI Records albums
Imperial Records albums
Albums produced by Sonny Bono
Albums conducted by Harold Battiste
Albums arranged by Harold Battiste
Albums recorded at Gold Star Studios